Sovetskoye is a rural locality (a selo) in Turshunaysky Selsoviet, Babayurtovsky District, Republic of Dagestan, Russia. The population was 1,057 as of 2010. There are 7 streets.

Geography 
Sovetskoye is located 12 km west of Babayurt (the district's administrative centre) by road. Turshunay is the nearest rural locality.

References 

Rural localities in Babayurtovsky District